The Women's super combined competition at the 2015 World Championships was held on Monday, February 9.

Results
The downhill run started at 10:00 local time (UTC−7) and the slalom run at 14:15.

References

Women's super combined
2015 in American women's sports
FIS